Fernando Bezerra Coelho (born December 7, 1957) is a Brazilian politician. He had represented Pernambuco in the Federal Senate from 2015 to 2023. Previously he was the Minister of National Integration from 2011 to 2013 and a Deputy from Pernambuco from 1987 to 1992. He is a member of the Brazilian Democratic Movement Party.

References

Living people
1957 births
Members of the Federal Senate (Brazil)
Members of the Chamber of Deputies (Brazil) from Pernambuco
Government ministers of Brazil
Brazilian Democratic Movement politicians
People from Petrolina